Claude Léon Auguste Piéplu (9 May 1923, Paris – 24 May 2006, Paris) was a French theater, film and television actor. He was known for his hoarse and frayed voice.

A follower of aerial humor and tongue-in-cheek humor, he distinguished himself in theater and cinema and, for the general public, is remembered as the narrator of the animated series Les Shadoks or the man with the keys to gold from the comedy TV series Palace.

In 1987 he was nominated for a Cesar Award for his role in Michel Deville's Le Paltoquet.

Selected filmography

D'homme à hommes (1948)  (uncredited)
Le Roi et l'oiseau (1952) as le maire du palais (voice)
Adorables démons (1957)
Suivez-moi jeune homme (1958) as contrôleur de train
Du rififi chez les femmes (1959) as un client au restaurant
It Happened All Night (1960) as cothes salesman
La Française et l'amour (1960) as Marsac (segment "Adultère, L'")
Le Caïd (1960) as Oxner
La Belle Américaine (1961) as Me Fachepot, le notaire
Un nommé La Rocca (1961) as le directeur de la prison
Le Théâtre de la jeunesse (1961, TV Series) as Maître Goupil / Michel et Tartolino / Benjamin Franklin / Thenardier / Panocratès / le libraire
La Chambre ardente (1962) as l'inspecteur
Le Diable et les dix commandements (1962) as un vigile (episode "Luxurieux point ne seras") (uncredited)
 How to Succeed in Love (1962) as le professeur de danse
Le glaive et la balance (1963) (uncredited)
Le temps des copains (1963)
Cherchez l'idole (1963) as himself
Let's Rob the Bank (1964) as the priest
Cherchez l'idole (1964) as Piéplu
Une souris chez les hommes (1964) as un inspecteur
Le Gendarme de St. Tropez (1964) as Boisselier
Les Copains (1965) as le colonel / army officer
Les Pieds dans le plâtre (1965) as le baron
Your Money or Your Life (1966) as un surveillant de l'agence de Paris
Si j'étais un espion (1967) as Monteil
La Guerre de Troie n'aura pas lieu (1967, TV Movie)
Diaboliquement vôtre (1967) as le décorateur
L'Homme à la Buick (1968) as le notaire
L'Écume des jours (1968) as le médecin
Les Shadoks (1968, TV Series) as narrator
La Prisonnière (1968) as le père de Josée
The Devil by the Tail (1969) as Monsieur Patin (Le client assidu)
Clérambard (1969) as Maître Galuchon
Que ferait donc Faber?! (1969, TV Mini-Series) as Gaston Faber / Georges Brevin
Hibernatus (1969) as le secrétaire général du ministère de l'intérieur
Agence Intérim (1969, Episode: Quiproquo)
Le Pistonné (1970) as le commandant
Les Shadoks (1970, TV Series) as narrator (voice)
Le Drapeau noir flotte sur la marmite (1971) as Alexandre Volabruque
La Coqueluche (1971) as le commandant
Au théâtre ce soir (1970-1971, TV Series) as Octave / Ford
Le Charme discret de la bourgeoisie (1972) as colonel
La Fin et les moyens (1972, TV Movie) as Etienne Varzy
Sex-shop (1972) as l'officier
Jean Vilar, une belle vie (1972) as himself
Témoignages (1973, Episode: "L'homme assis") as l'homme assis
Les Noces rouges (1973) as Paul Delamare
Défense de savoir (1973) as Descarne (as Claude Pieplu)
Les Aventures de Rabbi Jacob (1973) as le commissaire divisionnaire Andreani
Prêtres interdits (1973) as l'abbé Grégoire Ancely
Shadoks —  Troisième série, Les (1973, TV Series) as narrator (voice)
Par le sang des autres (1974) as le préfet
Les Valseuses (1974) as récitant de la bande-annonce (voice, uncredited)
La Gueule de l'emploi (1974) as le militaire
Gross Paris (1974) as Sam
Un nuage entre les dents (1974) as le directeur du journal
Le Fantôme de la liberté (1974) as commissioner
La moutarde me monte au nez (1974) as docteur Hubert Durois
Soirée Courteline (1974, TV Movie) as Des Rillettes (segment "Boulingrin, Les")
Section spéciale (1975) as Michel Benon, le président de la Section spéciale
C'est dur pour tout le monde (1975) as Marcel
Les Galettes de Pont-Aven (1975) as le pèlerin / le barde breton
Calmos (1976) as l'ancien combattant
La Meilleure façon de marcher (1976) as camp director
L'Ordinateur des pompes funèbres (1976) as Piette Tournier
Le Locataire (1976) as neighbor (as Claude Pieplu)
L 'Apprenti salaud (1977) as Etienne Forelon, le notaire de Briançon
Dites-lui que je l'aime (1977) as Chouin
Le Mille-pattes fait des claquettes (1977) as capitaine Leipzig
Les Folies Offenbach (1977, TV Mini-Series) as Villemessant
Et vive la liberté! (1978) as Lardenois
Chaussette surprise (1978) as le médecin
Vas-y maman (1978) as l'éditeur
Le Pion (1978) as le censeur
Le sucre (1978) as président Berot
Cinéma 16 (1978-1980, TV Series) as Claude / Louis Dupon
Ils sont grands, ces petits (1979) as Arthur Palanque
Chouette, chat, chien... show (1980, TV Movie) as la chouette hibou
Histoire contemporaine (1981, TV Mini-Series) as M. Bergeret
Mon meilleur Noël (1981, Episode: "L'oiseau bleu") as le grand-père
Emmenez-moi au théâtre (1982, TV Series) as Demokos
Merci Bernard (1982-1984, TV Series)
Allô Béatrice (1984, Episode: "Charmant week-end") as De Fénix
La Galette du roi (1986) as Lionel Costerman
Les Matics (1986, TV Series) as Récitant / narrator (voice)
Le Paltoquet (1986) as the professor
Beau temps mais orageux en fin de journée (1986) as Jacques
Un coupable (1988, TV Movie) as Monsieur Fiore
Palace (1988, TV Series) as Hugues-Jean Landreau, l'homme aux clefs d'or
Suivez cet avion (1989) as Ascar
Après après-demain (1990) as Alex
Années de plumes, années de plomb (1991, TV Movie) as Grousset
D 14 (1993, Short) as le supérieur hiérarchique
Casque bleu (1994) as Pierre
Le Silence du coeur (1994, TV Movie) as Henri Weber
Maigret (1994, TV Series) as Charles Dandurand
Les Faussaires (1994) as Ryckmans
Voyage de Pénélope, Le (1996, TV Movie) as Gaspard
Fallait pas! (1996) as Bernard's Father
Un amour impossible (1996, TV Mini-Series) as M. Louvet, l'armateur
Entre terre et mer (1997) (TV miniseries)
Chapeau bas (1998, Short) as Monsieur Julien
Astérix et Obélix contre César (1999) as Panoramix
Shadoks et le Big Blank, Les (2000, TV Series) as narrator (final appearance)

Video games
 The Bizarre Adventures of Woodruff and the Schnibble (1995) as narrator / professor Azimuth  (voice)

References

External links
 

1923 births
2006 deaths
Male actors from Paris
French male film actors
French male television actors
French male voice actors
Commandeurs of the Ordre des Arts et des Lettres
Deaths from cancer in France